I'm Real may refer to:

 "I'm Real" (Jennifer Lopez song), a 2001 song by Jennifer Lopez
 I'm Real (album), a 1988 album by James Brown
 "I'm Real" (James Brown song), a song from the album
 "I'm Real", a 1993 song from the Kris Kross album Da Bomb
 "I Am Real", a 2011 song by Simon van Kempen